SSAB AB, earlier Svenskt Stål AB (English: Swedish Steel), is a Swedish company, formed in 1978, that specialises in processing raw material to produce steel. The largest shareholders are Aktiebolag Industrivärden and the Government of Finland.

History
The headquarters are in central Stockholm. SSAB initially saw losses during the years 1978 to 1981, and became profitable in 1982. It is involved in the production of steel and steel products, both standardized and specialized for various fields and uses. In addition to steel production, the company also partners with design firms during their execution of architectural projects. Its R&D department works with customers in order to provide custom solutions for new projects. In 2014 SSAB became a member of the four year pilot program organization “Steel Eco-System” sponsored by the Swedish government. In November 2017 the company has a market cap of $35.55 billion, and is traded on the Stockholm NASDAQ exchange. The company is also the sponsor of the SSAB's Swedish Steel Prize. SSAB's operations which include the SSAB Special Steels, SSAB Europe, and SSAB Americas, and its subsidiaries Ruukki Construction and Tibnor. SSAB's offering includes such brands as SSAB Domex, Hardox, Docol, GreenCoat, Armox and Toolox.

In 2021, SSAB produced the first steel manufactured without the use of fossil fuels. Created with a process using hydrogen instead of traditional methods that require the coking process, the first fossil-free steel was delivered to Volvo on a trial basis.

Swedish operations
The production is located at Luleå, Borlänge, Oxelösund and Finspång. SSAB is the largest steel sheet manufacturer in Scandinavia, with its blast furnace, coking plant, and steelworks located in Luleå and its rolling mills and coating plants in Borlänge—the initial product is sent from one location to the other via train. The division also has a coil coating line, lamination line, and special steels production. SSAB Special Steels in Oxelösund is the only steelworks in Sweden to have its entire vertical production base in one place, from raw material handling to its rolling plates. Ninety percent of its production is exported, with its chief export partner being Germany.  SSAB produces nearly all of the steel plates created in Sweden. The company also has operations in China.

North American operations

IPSCO Inc. began as Prairie Pipe Manufacturing Co., Ltd. in Regina, Saskatchewan in 1956, changing its name to Interprovincial Steel and Pipe Corporation, Ltd. in 1960 and IPSCO, Inc. in 1984; the company would later be purchased by SSAB, and is the origin of SSAB's operations in the region. All SSAB operations in North America are now operated as SSAB Americas.

As of 2000, IPSCO had used mini mills to produce flat-rolled steel for 40 years. Late in 2001, the company officially opened an Axis, Alabama mill (in the Mobile area), with a capacity of 1,250,000 tonnes,. The $US425 million rolling mill, with mill stand housings believed to be the largest one-piece cast mill housings in the world at 350 tons each, uses scrap steel to produce discrete plate and coiled hot rolled plate.  Montpelier, Iowa had a similar facility which began operations in 1997, but this one would serve the Gulf coast. On 21 October 2008, SSAB announced a $US460 million expansion of the Axis mill to be completed in 2011. The mill already had 400 employees and 350 contractors.

In May 2007, a deal to acquire IPSCO for $US7.7 billion was announced. At the time, IPSCO's annual production was 4.3 million tonnes, with four steel mills and eleven pipe mills. On 17 July 2008, SSAB announced the completion of the deal. John Tulloch succeeded the retiring David Sutherland as IPSCO president and became an executive vice president of SSAB.

On 17 March 2008, Evraz Group SA announced it would buy SSAB's Canada pipe and plate business and the steel tube business of the American IPSCO unit for $US4.3 billion after steel prices rose and the dollar fell. Evraz also planned to sell some of the American assets for $US1.7 billion to OAO TMK. IPSCO had 4300 employees, with 70% of its operation in the United States and 30% in Canada.

After the sale, SSAB changed the name of its North American operation to SSAB North American Division (NAD), then later to SSAB Americas; headquarters stayed in Lisle, Illinois, USA. Included in this division were steel operations in Mobile and Montpelier, and cut-to-length lines in St. Paul, Minnesota and Houston, Texas, USA; and Toronto, Ontario, Canada. David Britten succeeded Tulloch as president. Paul Wilson, with 36 years of industry experience, ten of those with SSAB including management of Mobile's steel operation, became the vice president in charge of the American steel operations. In 2018 the SSAB Americas division relocated its headquarters to Mobile, Alabama.

Expanding to Finland
On 22 January 2014, it was announced that SSAB was to purchase Finnish steel manufacturer Rautaruukki for €1.1 bn. The headquarters for SSAB Europe are located in Hämeenlinna, Finland.

Brands 
SSAB's major brands include:

 Hardox 
 Strenx 
 Docol
 GreenCoat
 Toolox
 Armox
 SSAB Boron
 SSAB Domex
 SSAB Form
 SSAB Laser
 SSAB Weathering
 SSAB Multisteel
 Hardox In My Body
 My Inner Strenx
 Hardox Wearparts

Carbon footprint
SSAB reported Total CO2e emissions (Direct + Indirect) for 31 December 2020 at 9,989 Kt (−766 /-7.1% y-o-y). This is a higher rate of decline than over the period since 4Q'14 (−1.1% CAGR).

See also

List of Swedish companies

References

  (SSAB Annual Report 2014, 18 February 2015, Swedbank Handelsbanken PWC) Net-Sales-USA 2013/2014 2.793.358.400 US-Dollar

External links

Manufacturing companies established in 1978
Steel companies of Sweden
Companies listed on Nasdaq Helsinki
Swedish brands
Ironworks in Sweden
1978 establishments in Sweden
Manufacturing companies based in Stockholm
Companies listed on Nasdaq Stockholm